Žabokreky nad Nitrou is a village and municipality in Partizánske District in the Trenčín Region of western Slovakia.

History
In historical records the village was first mentioned in 1291.

Geography
The municipality lies at an elevation of 193 meters (633 ft) and covers an area of 6.977 km² (2.694 mi²). It has a population of about 1658 people.

References

External links

 
http://zabokrekynadnitrou.e-obce.sk

Villages and municipalities in Partizánske District